Chad Christensen was a member of the Nevada State Assembly where he served as a Republican and one of the two minority whips. He served from 2003–2005. He ran for the Republican nomination to run in 2010 for the United States Senate but lost in the primary.  He is a Mormon.

References

External links
 Nevada Legislature page

Republican Party members of the Nevada Assembly
Year of birth missing (living people)
Living people
Latter Day Saints from Nevada